The Béni Mansour-Béjaïa line is an Algerian railway connecting the Soummam River valley to the Algiers-Skikda line over 88 kilometers. The line was opened in full in 1899.

History 
During French Algeria, plans were made to connect Béjaia to the Algerian railway hub of Sétif in 1857. However, plans were revised to instead connect Béjaïa to the Algiers-Skikda mainline in the village of Béni Mansour (municipality of Boudjellil) between Algiers and Sétif. The Compagnie de l'est algérien received the concession for building this railroad on May 21, 1884. The line was first opened from Béjaïa to Tazmalt over a distance of 81 kilometers on December 10, 1888, and then connected to the Algiers-Skikda mainline on March 24, 1889.

Line description 
This single-track line generally flows the Soummam River valley in Bejaia Province and has stations in the communities of Béni Mansour (Boudjellil municipality), Tazmalt, Ouzellaguen municipality), Takriest-Seddouk (Seddouk municipality), Sidi Aïch, Ifenain Ilmathen, El Kseur, Oued Ghir, and the provincial capital of Béjaia.

References 

Railway lines in Algeria